"The Kill"  (written "The Kill (Bury Me)" on the single and music video) is a song by American band Thirty Seconds to Mars.  The song was released on January 24, 2006 as the second single from their second album, A Beautiful Lie. It was certified double platinum by the Recording Industry Association of America (RIAA) and peaked at number 65 on the Billboard Hot 100.

Overview
Jared Leto described the meaning of the song as, "It's really about a relationship with yourself. It's about confronting your fear and confronting the truth about who you are." He has also said it is about "confrontation as a crossroads" — coming face-to-face with who you really are.

In September 2007, "The Kill" was re-released again in the UK. It was also available as a Compact Disc with a A Beautiful Lie poster and two stickers, and a special limited edition 7" vinyl version. The song is played in 6/8 time.

Two alternate versions of the song exist: the "Rebirth" version, which adds in orchestral accompaniment and has no screaming, and an acoustic version featuring Brazilian singer Pitty that was only released in Brazil. On May 2, 2010, the band performed the song live with Chino Moreno from Deftones.

Music video
The video is a homage to the Stanley Kubrick's 1980 film The Shining based on the Stephen King novel. Several scenes are based on the film, such as when Shannon Leto enters Room 6277 and encounters the woman in the bathroom and another when Matt Wachter is served drinks at the bar by a doppelgänger apparition. The video culminates in an elegant ballroom in the same manner as the photo at the end of the film. At 2:07, the papers that Jared Leto has been typing are briefly made visible and the words on them appear to read, over and over, "This is who I really am." This is another allusion to The Shining, in which Jack Torrance types up pages and pages of the same line, "All work and no play makes Jack a dull boy", over and over in the same sense. The scene with a man in a bear costume, in a bedroom, is also from The Shining.

As for the cinematography, Jared Leto adopted the split screen visual from working with Darren Aronofsky in Requiem for a Dream.

The haunted room number is changed from 237 to 6277 in the video because it spells out "Mars" on a telephone keypad. The number also makes an appearance in the video for "From Yesterday" and "Up in the Air."

The music video was selected as the greatest rock video in the Kerrang Rock 100 on 27 June 2009.

When the press release info for "The Kill" video was released, Jared stated that the video was directed by an albino Danish man named Bartholomew Cubbins. This was intended as a joke as Cubbins is the main character of the Dr. Seuss book The 500 Hats of Bartholomew Cubbins, however airings of the video on music channels still list Cubbins as the director. Bartholomew Cubbins has remained Jared Leto's alias for directing Thirty Seconds to Mars' videos (with the exception of the video for A Beautiful Lie). The hotel scenes in the video were filmed at The Carlu in Toronto, Ontario.

Plot
The music video is based on the movie The Shining (1980). It features the band exploring a hotel which they are care-taking. At the start, Jared Leto states that they have the hotel all to themselves for three days; although, later on, after the first chorus, it comes on the screen saying "One Week Later", before showing the pages saying "This is who I really am". In the extended version of the video, the other band members complain that they have been at the hotel longer than expected and have canceled shows because of Jared's peculiar behavior, explaining the discrepancy.

A letter from the hotel owner tells the band to "Enjoy your stay and please stay out of Room 6277." Shannon Leto does not heed the warning and opens Room 6277. Following the opening of the door, each band member begins to experience the effects of the room opening throughout the hotel. Each member experiences the effects differently, but one thing remains constant for each individual – they encounter a version of themselves dressed in a 1920s style tuxedo with tails. Several other apparitions then take up residence in the hotel, dispelling the promise Jared made in the beginning of the video that the band will have the hotel all to themselves and that "there's not gonna be a single fucking soul". The video reaches its climax when Tomo encounters himself in bed with a man in a bear suit (another Shining reference), and immediately the band dressed in tuxedos are shown performing the song in the hotel's ballroom in front of a crowd of twins, dressed like the roaring 1920s, dancing with themselves. The theme of duplicity resonates throughout the video.

Track listing
Standard
"The Kill (Bury Me)" – 3:52
"Attack" (live at CBGB, July 2006) – 4:06
"The Kill (Bury Me)" (acoustic, live on VH1) – 3:48

UK release
"The Kill (Rebirth)" – 3:52
"The Kill (Rebirth)" (acoustic, live on VH1) – 3:48

UK re-release
"The Kill (Rebirth)" – 3:52
"Was It a Dream?" (iTunes live session) – 3:46

Brazil release
"The Kill (acoustic)" (featuring Pitty) – 3:44

Personnel
 Jared Leto – vocals, guitar
 Tomo Miličević – guitar, programming
 Matt Wachter – bass guitar, keyboard
 Shannon Leto – drums
 Matt Serletic  – piano

Charts
The song broke a record on Billboard's Modern Rock Tracks chart by remaining on the chart for 52 weeks; however, the song never made it to the top spot, peaking at number 3. Their next single, "From Yesterday", would be their first to reach the top, but spent less time on the charts than "The Kill". The song crossed to the Billboard Hot 100, where it peaked at number 65.

Certifications

Accolades

Awards
Won Best Single at the Kerrang! Awards 2007.
On August 31, 2006, the band won the MTV2 Award for "The Kill" at the MTV Video Music Awards, one of their two nominations. The second nomination was for best rock video; however, they lost to AFI's "Miss Murder".
"The Kill" was awarded Best Video of the Year and Best Rock Video at the MTV Australia Video Music Awards (AVMAs).
Won 2006 fuse Fangoria Chainsaw Award for Best Video Inspired by a Movie.
Won The Rock Out! Award at the 2007 MTV EMA's (Europe Music Awards).

In popular culture
The song is featured as one of the themes of The Invisible, and a live music video is included on the DVD releases, as well as the song being part of the soundtrack.
The song is featured in the January 21, 2007 Without a Trace episode, "Primed".
During the 2007 MTV Movie Awards, "The Kill" was played as the background music of the nomination screen for the film 300, which was nominated for the Best Movie award.
The song was featured in the October 25, 2007 episode of the television show Hollyoaks.
The song is available as downloadable content for Rock Band.
The song is featured in the video games Guitar Hero World Tour and Guitar Hero Live.
The song is featured in the video game Rock Band Track Pack Volume 1 for the PlayStation 2 and Wii.
The song is used by the International Luge Federation for their TV live introductions.

Covers
The American Christian metal band Blood of the Martyrs recorded a cover of the song and released it as a single on November 23, 2011. The cover was a departure from the band's deathcore style, instead opting for a metalcore sound with clean vocals.

References

External links

Thirty Seconds to Mars songs
2006 singles
Songs written by Jared Leto
Canadian Singles Chart number-one singles
2005 songs
Virgin Records singles
Song recordings produced by Josh Abraham